There are generally four classes of software used to support the Six Sigma process improvement protocol:
Analysis tools, which are used to perform statistical or process analysis;
Program management tools, used to manage and track a corporation's entire Six Sigma program;
DMAIC and Lean online project collaboration tools for local and global teams;
Data Collection tools that feed information directly into the analysis tools and significantly reduce the time spent gathering data.

Analysis tools

Notes

References

Six Sigma software packages
Quality